Pristimantis riveti is a species of frog in the family Strabomantidae. It is endemic to Ecuador and as currently understood, only known with certainty from its type locality, Mount Mirador near the border between Carchi and Sucumbíos Provinces. Records from elsewhere (e.g., IUCN Red List) represent other species, including Pristimantis lutzae. Common names Despax's robber frog and Riveti robber frog have been proposed for it.

Etymology
The specific name riveti honors Paul Rivet, French physician who collected the holotype.

Description
Adult males measure  and adult females  in snout–vent length. There are distinctive big white irregular blotches dispersed over the dorsal surface.

Habitat and conservation
Pristimantis riveti occurs in páramo habitats on the ground or low in vegetation (Cortaderia and terrestrial bromeliads).

References

riveti
Amphibians of the Andes
Amphibians of Ecuador
Endemic fauna of Ecuador
Amphibians described in 1911
Taxonomy articles created by Polbot